Francis Austin (10 April 1882 – 23 January 1938) was a Barbadian cricketer. He played in ten first-class matches for the Barbados and British Guiana from 1904 to 1913.

See also
 List of Barbadian representative cricketers

References

External links
 

1882 births
1938 deaths
Barbadian cricketers
Barbados cricketers
Guyana cricketers
People from Saint Michael, Barbados